The Palacio Haedo is a 19th-century building on the Avenida Santa Fe in Buenos Aires, Argentina. It is located to the south of the Torre de Los Ingleses and the Plaza San Martín and Monument del libertador Jose de Plaza San Martín, in close proximity to the Consulate of Colombia and the Gran Hotel Buenos Aires. It was built in the late 19th century as a residence for the Haedo family by architects Passeroni and Brizuela in the Neo-Gothic style.

In 1871, the residence was acquired by Reynaldo Villar and subsequently by Dominga Villar y Cristina Manuela Villar, but soon came under the ownership of the Banco Popular Argentino. Now the headquarters of the National Parks Administration, it has been a listed historic monument since 2001.

History
The building was completed in the latter half of the 19th century as a residence for the well-to-do Haedo family. Mariano Francisco Haedo (1816–1886) had made a fortune in railways and banking. Designed by the architects Passeroni and Brizuela in the Neo-Gothic style, it first resembled an Italian castle. It was fitted out as a villa suitable for an aristocratic family and subsequently enhanced with Renaissance trimmings.

In 1871, the residence was acquired by Reynaldo Villar and subsequently by Dominga Villar y Cristina Manuela Villar, but soon came under the ownership of the Banco Popular Argentino. In October 1942, under President Ramón Castillo, the State bought the building for the national parks directorate (Dirección de Parques Nacionales). In so doing, it contributed to preserving the surroundings of the Plaza San Martín. Today, the strangely shaped triangular complex bounded by Maipú, Avenida Santa Fe, and Marcelo T. de Alvear, still houses the headquarters of the national parks authority, now known as the Administración de Parques Nacionales. Bibliotica Francisco P Moreno is also located in this building.

Listed building

Since 2001, under Bill 25.427, the building has been listed as a national historic monument.

Gallery

References

Buildings and structures in Buenos Aires
Government buildings in Argentina
Renaissance Revival architecture in Argentina